Canada's Mormon Trail has a variety of National Historic Sites, Provincial Historic Sites and many points of interest that display the unique cultural heritage the Mormons have had in the settling of Southern Alberta.

The Mormon Trail begins with the Village Stirling and follows highway 52 and highway 3 to Cardston.

Communities along the trail;

(see also LDS Settlements in Canada)

 Village of Stirling 
 Town of Raymond
 Hamlet of Welling
 Town of Magrath
 Hamlet of Spring Coulee
 Hamlet of Woolford
 Town of Cardston
 Hamlet of Leavitt
 Village of Mountain View

Historical Sites and points of interest;

(see also List of attractions and landmarks in Stirling, Alberta)

Stirling Agricultural Village - National Historic Site
Galt Historic Railway Park, Stirling
Michelsen Farmstead, Stirling
William T. Ogden House
Raymond Museum
Raymond Golf club
Farm Safety Centre, Raymond
Galt Canal Nature Trail, Magrath - National Historic Site
Magrath Golf Club
Card Pioneer Home, Cardston
Cardston Alberta Temple
Cardston Lee Creek Valley Golf Course
Carriage House Theatre, Cardston
Cobblestone Manor, Cardston
Courthouse Museum, Cardston
Remington Carriage Museum, Cardston

Events;

Stirling Settler Days, Stirling
Raymond Stampede, Raymond
Hometown Christmas, Magrath
I Swam the Dam: Triathlon, Magrath

See also

 Mormon Corridor
 Oregon Trail
 Mormon Trail
 Mormonism
 Pioneer Day in Utah on July 24
 Latter-day Saint settlements in Canada

References

External links
 Canada's Mormon Trail

 Trail
The Church of Jesus Christ of Latter-day Saints in Canada
Tourist attractions in Alberta
Pilgrimage routes
History of religion in Canada